Sepp Wildgruber (born 1 January 1959, in Oberaudorf) is a German former alpine skier who competed in the 1984 Winter Olympics.

External links
 sports-reference.com
 

1959 births
Living people
German male alpine skiers
Olympic alpine skiers of West Germany
Alpine skiers at the 1984 Winter Olympics
People from Rosenheim (district)
Sportspeople from Upper Bavaria
20th-century German people